Hermann Heinrich Grauert (7 September 1850 – 12 March 1924) since 1914 Knight of Grauert, was a German historian. He was born in Pritzwalk and died in Munich.

Life
After attending the Realschule in Wittstock, Grauert initially worked in his father's manufactured goods shop. In 1872 he went to Münster where in 1873 he sat exams in Latin, Greek and history, in order to obtain a qualification equivalent to the Abitur, to enable him to attend university. From 1873 to 1876 he studied history at the University of Göttingen and received his PhD under Georg Waitz. Grauert then extended his historical and legal knowledge at the universities of Berlin, Munich and Strasbourg .

Since his student days, Grauert was an avid Kartellverband member in Göttingen in K.St.V. Winfridia, in Berlin at the Catholic Reading Club (now K.St.V. Askania-Burgundia Berlin) and in Munich in the K.St.V. Ottonia. Later, he was still in further Kartellverband compounds honor Philistines, such as at Alamannia and Rheno-Bavaria, Munich. In the Festschrift for the 25th anniversary of the Association, Hermann von Grauert 1906 is shown as an honorary member.

1877 Grauert was an intern at the National Archives active in Munich; he habilitated in 1883 after a stay in Rome, and became a full-time professor of University of Munich in 1885. Through 1915 and 1916, he was the rector of the university.

1884 Grauert board member since 1885 and editor of History Yearbook of Görres Society. Grauert played a prominent role in the society until his death.

In Germany and Europe, he was highly regarded as a scientist. Grauert was Privy Councillor and was created in 1914 by King Ludwig III. with the Knight's Cross of the Order of Merit of the Bavarian Crown encumbered. This was associated with the collection in the personal nobility, and he was allowed after entry into the Matricula Knights of Grauert call. In Munich Harlaching the "Grauertstraße" was named after him in 1959.

Women's rights activist Lida Gustava Heymann described him as "stock Catholic".

Works
Die Kaisergräber im Dom zu Speyer. 1901.
Meister Johann von Toledo. 1901.
Dante und Houston Stewart Chamberlain. 1903.
Görres in Straßburg. 1910.

Literature
S. Koß. In: Biographisches Lexikon des KV. Band 5 (1998) S. 59ff.  m.w.N.
Ansgar Frenken: Hermann von Grauert. In: Biographisch-Bibliographisches 
Kirchenlexikon (BBKL). Band 30, Bautz, Nordhausen 2009, Sp. 518–522.

References

1850 births
1924 deaths
People from Pritzwalk
People from the Province of Brandenburg
19th-century German historians
20th-century German historians
University of Göttingen alumni
Academic staff of the Ludwig Maximilian University of Munich